Judith Wechsler (née Glatzer; December 28, 1940) is an American art historian and filmmaker. She is the National Endowment for the Humanities Professor Emerita at Tufts University, specializing in nineteenth-century French painting, drawing, and caricature, and an award-winning documentary filmmaker.  She has also taught at MIT and Harvard.

Wechsler earned her BA from Brandeis University, MA from Columbia University and her PhD at the University of California at Los Angeles, writing her thesis on "Major Trends in Cézanne Interpretation.”

References

External links
 
 

Living people
1940 births
American art historians
Tufts University faculty
Brandeis University alumni
Columbia University alumni
University of California, Los Angeles alumni
Women art historians
Massachusetts Institute of Technology faculty
Harvard University faculty
American women documentary filmmakers